Pennsylvania Route 791 (PA 791) is a state highway located in Penn Hills in Allegheny County, Pennsylvania. It runs  from U.S. Route 22 Business (US 22 Bus.) in Churchill to PA 380 in Penn Hills. The entire route is part of the Yellow Belt of the Allegheny County belt system. The route runs through a suburban area of Pittsburgh.

Route description

PA 791 heads north from the southern terminus on Rodi Road, passing through suburbs. At the terminus, the road continues in both directions as US 22 Business and as part of the Yellow Belt Shortly after the intersection, it heads under Interstate 376 and receives traffic from exit 80. Two miles to the north, it ends at PA 380 in Penn Hills at a shopping plaza.

History
PA 791 was originally assigned as PA 280, along with the remainder of Rodi Road from US 22 Bus. to Thompson Run Road in Wilkins Township, in 1928.  The route was decommissioned in 1946 and the northern segment received its current route number in 1963.

Major intersections

See also

References

External links

Pennsylvania Highways: PA 791

791